Chris MacManus (born 13 March 1973) is an Irish politician who has been a Member of the European Parliament (MEP) from Ireland for the Midlands–North-West constituency since March 2020. He is a member of Sinn Féin, part of The Left in the European Parliament – GUE/NGL.

Personal life
His father is Seán MacManus, a retired Sinn Féin politician.
His older brother, Joseph MacManus, was an IRA volunteer who was killed in Belleek, County Fermanagh in February 1992. He was born in London, but in late 1976, the family returned to Ireland to live in Sligo town.

He was cast in Ken Loach's Cannes nominated film Jimmy's Hall in 2014 which was filmed extensively in Counties Sligo and Leitrim.

Political career
He was a member of Sligo Borough Council (formerly Sligo Corporation) from 1999 to 2014 having been elected on three occasions and was a member of Sligo County Council from 2017 to 2020. He was co-opted in March 2017 to replace his father Seán MacManus and retained the seat at the 2019 Sligo County Council election.

He contested the 2016 Irish general election in the Sligo–Leitrim (Dáil constituency) and was the last candidate to be eliminated. His transfers elected his running mate Martin Kenny.

MEP Matt Carthy was elected as a TD for the Cavan–Monaghan constituency at the 2020 general election. MacManus was nominated to replace him in the European Parliament. Arthur Gibbons was co-opted to MacManus' seat on Sligo County Council on his nomination to the European Parliament.

MacManus sits on the Agriculture and Rural Development Committee as well as the Committee on Economic and Monetary Affairs. In the former capacity, he is a shadow rapporteur for The Left on the 2020/21 reform of the Common Agricultural Policy (CAP).

He is also a member of the EU Delegations for relations with South Africa and with Palestine.

References

External links

1973 births
Living people
Local councillors in County Sligo
MEPs for the Republic of Ireland 2019–2024
Sinn Féin MEPs
People from Sligo (town)
Politicians from County Sligo